E' (E + apostrophe) may represent:
 E′ (E + prime)
 É (E + acute accent)

It is not to be confused with:
 È (E + grave accent)
 Ė (E + overdot)
 Eʻ (E + ʻokina)
 Eꞌ  (E + saltillo)
 Ẻ (E + hook above)
 Eʾ (E + right half ring)
 Eʿ (E + left half ring)